Edward Alan Sullivan (November 29, 1868 — August 6, 1947) was a Canadian poet and author of short stories. He is noted for his 1935 historical adventure novel The Great Divide, which depicts the construction of the Canadian Pacific Railway.

History
Born in St. George's Rectory, Montreal, he was the oldest son of Edward Sullivan and Frances Mary Renaud. In 1869, his father became rector of Trinity Church, Chicago. The family lived to the city in 1871, and thus witnessed the Great Chicago Fire. When he was 15, he began attending Loretto in Musselburgh, Scotland, a famous school for boys.

On his return to Canada, he attended the School of Practical Science, Toronto. After this he did railway exploration work in the West, and later worked in mining. He was assistant engineer in the Clergue enterprises at Sault Ste. Marie, Ontario for a year and a half, before the organization of the Consolidated Lake Superior Company. Subsequently, he spent several years as a mining engineer in the Lake of the Woods district during the period of its gold exploitation.

Writing
He gained recognition in the United States through his poems, short stories and comprehensive articles on various themes. These frequently appeared in Harper's Magazine, the Atlantic Monthly, and other leading American periodicals. In 1941 he won the Governor General's Award for English-language fiction for the novel Three Came to Ville Marie. Wonder Stories reviewed his lost race novel In the Beginning favorably, saying its depiction of an encounter between modern men and Pleistocene-era tribesmen was a "most tremendous drama of inter-racial conflict".

Selected bibliography
The Passing of Oul-i-but (1913)
Blantyre — Alien (1914)The Inner Door (1917)Aviation in Canada, 1917-18 (1919)The Rapids (1920)The Crucible (1925)The Jade God (1925)Human Clay (1926; as Sinclair Murray)In the Beginning (1926; as Sinclair Murray)The Splendid Silence (1927)Whispering Lodge (1927)Under the Northern Lights (1928) Short Story collection:TradeThe Eyes of SebastienThe Spirit of the NorthThe Circuit of the Wild SwanThe Blindness of PitulukMotherhoodThe Magic of KahdooshThe Reward of KwasindThe Loyalty of PeegukThe Passing of Chantie, the CurlewThe Affair of Kalauk, the Skilful HunterThe Salving of PyackA Little Way Ahead (1930; as Sinclair Murray)The Magic Makers (1930)The Golden Foundling (1931)The Great Divide (1935)With Love from Rachel (1938)
 Three Came to Ville Marie (1941)Cariboo Road (1946)

References

Biography by John Garvin, dated 1916
Full e-text of Under the Northern Lights, hosted by Project Gutenberg of Australia
Partial e-text of The Passing of Oul-i-but, hosted by Mount Royal College
Gordon D. McLeod. Essentially Canadian: The Life and Fiction of Alan Sullivan.'' Waterloo, Ontario: Wilfrid Laurier University Press, 1982.

External links
 
 
 
 
Works by Alan Sullivan at Digital Archive (Toronto Public Library)

1868 births
1947 deaths
20th-century Canadian poets
Canadian male poets
Governor General's Award-winning fiction writers
Canadian male novelists
Canadian male short story writers
Writers from Montreal
Anglophone Quebec people
People educated at Loretto School, Musselburgh
20th-century Canadian short story writers
20th-century Canadian novelists
20th-century Canadian male writers